Butterfly Lovers is a Chinese television series based on the legend of the Butterfly Lovers, starring Peter Ho and Dong Jie as Liang Shanbo and Zhu Yingtai respectively. The series was first broadcast on GZTV in China in 2007.

Cast

Peter Ho as Liang Shanbo
Dong Jie as Zhu Yingtai
Chen Guanlin as Ma Wencai
Yue Yueli as Zhu Yingtai's father
Wu Qianqian as Zhu Yingtai's mother
Kou Zhenhai as Wang Shiyu
Che Yongli as Wang Shiyu's wife
Wan Hongjie as Zhu Yingqi
Liu Fang as Liang Shanbo's mother
Jia Zhaoji as Chen Zijun
Zhan Xiaonan as Xie Daoyun
Xie Yuanzhen as Yinxin
Chen Cheng as Sijiu
Chen Chen as Wang Lan
Ming Hui as Wang Hui
Wang Quanyou as Tao Yuanming
Guo Jun as Governor Ma
Wang Pin as Wang Zhuoran
Zhang Shuai as Wang Lantian
Qu Xin as Xu Jubo
Jiang Hong as Huang Liangyu
Lin Jiangguo as Qin Jingsheng
Ran Weiqun as Xie An
Ren Zhong as Wang Ningzhi
Wang Xiaoshen as Su An
Gao Zifang as Su An's mother

Music
 Shuang Fei (双飞; Fly in a Pair), the ending song, performed by Peter Ho. This song was one of the themes from The Lovers (1994) and was originally sung by Nicky Wu.
 Yuan Fang (远方; Distant Place), the opening song, performed by Hongbutiao (红布条) and Erica Li (李悦君).
 Ling Hua Jing (菱花镜; Water Chestnut Flower Mirror) performed by Erica Li.

External links
  Butterfly Lovers on Sina.com

2007 Chinese television series debuts
Chinese romantic fantasy television series
Television series set in the Eastern Jin (317–420)
Mandarin-language television shows